Masataka Nashida (Japanese:梨田 昌孝, born August 4, 1953 in Hamada, Shimane, Japan) is a former Nippon Professional Baseball catcher and manager. As a player, he played for the Kintetsu Buffaloes from 1972 to 1988. After playing, he went on to manage three NPB teams. First, Nashida was the final manager of the Osaka Kintetsu Buffaloes before they were dissolved and merged after the 2004 season. He then went on to manage the Hokkaido Nippon-Ham Fighters from 2008 to 2011. Finally, he went on to manage the Tohoku Rakuten Golden Eagles, the team created to fill the void left by the Buffaloes merger. He was able to lead the Eagles to their third-ever playoff berth in 2017, however he resigned in July the next year when the club dropped to 20 games below a .500 winning percentage. After his resignation, Eagles' coach Yosuke Hiraishi acted as team's interim manager for the remainder of the 2018 season.

References

External links
Career statistics and player information from Baseball-Reference or NPB (in Japanese)

1953 births
Hokkaido Nippon-Ham Fighters managers
Japanese baseball players
Kintetsu Buffaloes players
Living people
Managers of baseball teams in Japan
Nippon Professional Baseball catchers
Osaka Kintetsu Buffaloes managers
Baseball people from Shimane Prefecture
Tohoku Rakuten Golden Eagles managers